Hypochthonella is a monotypic genus of Fulgoromorpha (planthoppers), with the single species, Hypochthonella caeca discovered from Zimbabwe.  This species is the only known representative of the monotypic family Hypochthonellidae China & Fennah, 1952.

References

External links

Auchenorrhyncha genera
Hemiptera of Africa